The Ministry of Education and Culture of Uruguay is the ministry of the Government of Uruguay that is responsible for the coordination of national education, the promotion of the country's cultural development, the preservation of the nation's artistic, historical and cultural heritage, as well as innovation, science and technology and the promotion and strengthening of the validity of human rights. It is also responsible for the development of the state communication multimedia system and for promoting the digitized access of the entire population to information.

It is also responsible for the formulation and coordination of policies regarding the judicial defense of the interests of the State and for ensuring the necessary information for the correct application of the law. The Ministry is headquartered in the Reconquista Street in Ciudad Vieja, Montevideo. The current Minister of Education and Culture is Pablo Da Silveira, who has held the position since 1 March 2020.

History 
The first record of a public body for the administration of education dates from 26 February 1848 with the creation of the Institute of Public Instruction. This institute had executive, technical, and administrative powers. A year later, the University of the Republic was founded, which had among its missions, teaching at all levels, a fact that was never put into practice. In 1891, a cabinet reshuffle was made, becoming the newly created Ministry of Development responsible for the administration of public education.

On 12 March 1907, then President Claudio Williman made a new cabinet reshuffle, dividing the Ministry of Development into the "Ministry of Public Works" on the one hand and the Ministers of Industry, Work and Public Instruction on the other.

In the second presidency of José Batlle y Ordóñez another cabinet reshuffle of the ministries takes place, so on 4 March 1912 the Ministry of Justice and Public Instruction is constituted. Subsequently, on 19 March 1936 the then de facto president Gabriel Terra called him Ministry of Public Instruction and Social Prevision.

In 1967 it receives a new denomination, it began to be called Ministry of Culture, but finally in 1970 it obtained the current denomination of Ministry of Education and Culture.

Source:

List of Ministers of Education and Culture 
List of Ministers of Education and Culture of Uruguay since 1884 (under its various naming):

References

External links 
 Uruguayan Ministry of Education and Culture (in Spanish only)

 
Education and Culture
Ministers